
Year 112 BC was a year of the pre-Julian Roman calendar. At the time it was known as the Year of the Consulship of Drusus and Caesoninus (or, less frequently, year 642 Ab urbe condita) and the Fifth Year of Yuanding. The denomination 112 BC for this year has been used since the early medieval period, when the Anno Domini calendar era became the prevalent method in Europe for naming years.

Events 
 By place 

 Roman Republic 
 The Roman Senate declares war against Jugurtha following the Siege of Cirta (ends 105 BC).

 Asia 
Han-Nanyue War
 Lü Jia, Premier of the Han vassal state of Nanyue, opposes increased Han control and refuses to appear before the king of Nanyue and the envoys of Han. He rebels against the Han when Emperor Wu sends an armed force of 2,000 men to kill him and his allies. Lü kills king Zhao Xing and his regent, Queen Dowager Jiu, massacres the Han force, and installs Zhao Jiande as king.
 Autumn - Emperor Wu launches a major invasion of Nanyue, sending five riverine fleets to invade under Lu Bode, Yang Pu and three former Yue generals.
 The king of Dongyue, Zou Yushan, sends an army to link up with Yang Pu, but he secretly sends an envoy to Zhao Jiande and halts the transport fleet to await the war's outcome, claiming that the weather is preventing its advance.
 Emperor Wu executes his favourite necromancer Luan Da for fraud.

Deaths 
 Adherbal, king of Numidia
 Cleopatra IV, queen of Egypt
 Zhao Xing, ruler of Nanyue

References